The Halifax Thunderbirds are a lacrosse team based in Halifax, Nova Scotia, that plays in the National Lacrosse League (NLL). the 2020 NLL season was their first season the NLL. They were formerly the Rochester Knighthawks but moved to Halifax, as Rochester gained an expansion franchise. Due to the COVID-19 pandemic, the season was suspended on March 12, 2020. On April 8, the league made a further public statement announcing the cancellation of the remaining games of the 2020 season and that they would be exploring options for playoffs once it was safe to resume play.

On June 4th, the league confirmed that the playoffs would also be cancelled due to the pandemic.

Regular season

Final standings

Game log

Cancelled games

Roster

Goaltenders

Defenseman
 

 

Forwards

 

 

Transition

Practice

Injured

Head Coach
 Mike Accursi

Assistant Coaches
 Chad Culp
 Jason Johnson
 Roger Chrysler
 Billy Dee Smith

Athletic Performance Coach
 Dan Noble

Equipment Manager
 Dave Sowden

Entry Draft
The 2019 NLL Entry Draft took place on September 17, 2019. The Thunderbirds made the following selections:

References

Halifax Thunderbirds seasons
Halifax Thunderbirds season